The stone dormouse (Graphiurus rupicola) is a species of rodent in the family Gliridae. It is found in Namibia, South Africa, and possibly Angola. Its natural habitat is rocky areas in the Karoo. Though it has a limited range, it is a fairly common species and the International Union for Conservation of Nature has assessed its conservation status as being of "least concern".

Description
The dorsal colour varies from silvery-grey to dull grey or dark grey. The underparts are white or cream tinted with dark grey, and there is a sharp colour divide between the dorsal and ventral areas. The skull is somewhat flattened, the ears are fairly large and oval and the eyes are large. There is a conspicuous mask around the eyes and the cheeks are white, this colour extending in a stripe across the shoulders. The hind feet are usually white but may have dark streaks on top. The tail is grey with many white hairs, and has a white tip.

Distribution and habitat
The stone dormouse is endemic to southwestern Africa where its range includes mountainous parts of Namibia and South Africa, with records from a single location in Angola, mostly at altitudes above  and up to at least . Its typical habitat is in rocky outcrops and in kopjes (rocky, elevated areas on an otherwise flat plain) where it lives in crevices. It mostly inhabits Karoo or Karoo transition areas, though the specimens found in Angola were found in evergreen woodland on a mountain summit.

Status
The stone dormouse is a fairly common species in suitable habitat and faces no particular threats. It occurs in several protected areas and the International Union for Conservation of Nature has assessed its conservation status as being of "least concern".

References

Holden, M. E.. 2005. Family Gliridae. pp. 819–841 in Mammal Species of the World a Taxonomic and Geographic Reference. D. E. Wilson and D. M. Reeder eds. Johns Hopkins University Press, Baltimore.

Graphiurus
Mammals described in 1925
Taxa named by Oldfield Thomas
Taxa named by Martin Hinton
Taxonomy articles created by Polbot